William Mitsch,  born March 29, 1947 in Wheeling, West Virginia USA, is an ecosystem ecologist and ecological engineer who was co-laureate of the 2004 Stockholm Water Prize in August 2004 as a result of a career in wetland ecology and restoration, ecological engineering, and ecological modelling.


History
Mitsch  graduated from Wheeling Central Catholic High School in Wheeling, West Virginia, in 1965 and University of Notre Dame in 1969 where he majored in mechanical engineering.  He then worked for two years in the power industry—for American Electric Power in Ohio and for Commonwealth Edison in Chicago.  It was at the latter utility that he became part of their then-new environmental planning staff in 1970, being influenced by the first Earth Day in May 1970.  He then went to the University of Florida in Gainesville and received an M.E. degree (1972) and Ph.D. (1975) in environmental engineering sciences.  In his Ph.D. program he transitioned to become more of an ecologist, studying wetlands and lakes in Florida under Professor H.T. Odum. Prior to arriving at Florida Gulf Coast University in late 2012, he was on the faculties at Illinois Institute of Technology (1975–79), University of Louisville (1979–85), and, for 26 years at Ohio State University (1986-2012).

Contributions
His most significant contributions are 1. development of the field of ecological engineering as an author of the first book on this subject and the founder (in 1992) and editor-in-chief of the scientific journal Ecological Engineering, 2. creation of the Olentangy River Wetland Research Park, a unique 20-hectare (50-acre) wetland research laboratory and now Ramsar Wetland of International Importance at The Ohio State University, 3. major contributions toward the development of the field of wetland ecology, particularly as first author of five editions of the standard textbook Wetlands, a book that continues to be used around the world to teach wetland ecology.  That book has educated several generations of wetland scientists since it was first introduced in 1986. Dr. Mitsch's research has emphasized wetlands for nutrient removal in the agricultural Mississippi-Ohio-Missouri (MOM) River Basin (Mitsch et al. 2001, 2012, 2014)  and more recently to protect the Florida Everglades (Mitsch et al. 2015; Marois and Mitsch 2015a; Mitsch 2016a; Mitsch et al., 2018) and Lake Erie in the Laurentian Great Lakes (Mitsch et al., 2017). His recent research continues to focus on solving harmful algal blooms, including red tide, with treatment wetlands and restored landscapes (Griffiths and Mitsch, 2017; Nesbit and Mitsch, 2018; Mitsch, 2018) and also on the ecosystem service of natural and restored/created wetlands in mitigating climate change (Mitsch et al. 2010, 2013; Villa and Mitsch, 2015; Marois and Mitsch 2015b; Li and Mitsch, 2016; Mitsch 2016b; Mitsch and Mander, 2018).

Mitsch is currently Eminent Scholar and Director, Everglades Wetland Research Park, Florida Gulf Coast University, Naples, Florida. Before October 2012 he was Distinguished Professor of Environment and Natural Resources at The Ohio State University and Director of the University's Wilma H. Schiermeier Olentangy River Wetland Research Park. His research and teaching has focused on wetland biogeochemistry, wetland creation and restoration, ecological engineering, and ecosystem modeling.  Dr. Mitsch has authored or co-authored over 600 papers, books, published abstracts and other publications in ecological and environmental science. He is co-author or co-editor of 20 books including senior author of Ecological Engineering (1989), Ecological Engineering and Ecosystem Restoration (2004), 5 editions of Wetlands (1986–2015), and Wetland Ecosystems (2009).

Mitsch has served on committees of the Science Advisory Board (SAB) of the U.S. Environmental Protection Agency (2001–2011) and on several United States National Research Council (NRC) committees of the National Academy of Sciences (1991–2004).

His international activity includes serving as a Fulbright Senior Specialist at the Harry Oppenheimer Okavango Research Centre, University of Botswana in 2007 and at the Bialystok University of Technology in Poland in 2016, a Fulbright Fellow, University of Copenhagen, Denmark (1986–1987) and an advisor/researcher for several Chinese universities; United Nations Environmental Programme, Egypt and Jordan; EARTH University, Costa Rica; IAMZ (Mediterranean Agronomic Institute of Zaragoza), Spain; SCOPE (Scientific Committee on Problems of the Environment), Paris, France; and MISTRA (Foundation for Strategic Environmental Research), Sweden, among other locations. He was chair of EcoSummit 2012 held in Columbus, Ohio, USA and is co-chair of EcoSummit 2016 held in Montpellier, France.

Among his awards, Mitsch and his colleague and frequent co-author Sven Jørgensen of Denmark received the 2004 Stockholm Water Prize from King Carl XVI Gustaf of Sweden on August 19, 2004 in Stockholm, Sweden.  He also received the National Wetland Research Award (1996) from the U.S. Environmental Protection Agency and Environmental Law Institute, the Theodore M. Sperry Award (2005) for a career in ecosystem restoration from the Society for Ecological Restoration, a SWS Lifetime Achievement Award (2007) from the Society of Wetland Scientists (SWS), an Einstein Professorship from the Chinese Academy of Sciences (2010), and The Ramsar Convention Award for Merit presented at Ramsar Committee of Party (COP) 12th Congress, Puenta del Este, Uruguay on June 3, 2015. His Olentangy River Wetland Research Park at Ohio State University became the 24th USA Ramsar Wetland of International Importance in June 2008 from the Ramsar Convention in Switzerland. In 2010, he was awarded Doctorate honoris causa by the University of Tartu in Estonia.

Videos
William Mitsch on Wetland Preservation - CCTV China 2015 

Bill Mitsch discusses wetlands and watersheds CHNEP September 2013

Selected publications
About William Mitsch

 "Black Swamp Savior: How Bringing Back Conquered Wetlands Could Help Solve Harmful Algal Blooms" Lori Balster, Environmental Monitor, July 31, 2018 
 "Restoration of historic Great Black Swamp could help save Lake Erie" Tom Henry, Toledo Blade September 22, 2017 
 "Learning to Love the Great Black Swamp: Midwest settlers worked for generations to tame  the wicked swamplands west of Lake Erie. Can they be convinced to give some back?" Sharon Levy, UNDARK March 31, 2017 
 "Wheeling Central Grad Comes Home" Heather Ziegler, The Intelligencer / Wheeling News-Register 9 August 2015 
 "Wetland warrior: Professor brings expertise to environmental front line: The Everglades" Drew Sterwald, Pinnacle, Florida Gulf Coast University's Magazine November 2012 
 "A life bogged down: Biologist Bill Mitsch spent career at Ohio State creating world-class wetlands" Spencer Hunt, 2012. Columbus Dispatch 30 September 2012 
 
 
 Waist-deep in Ecological Integrity, Notre Dame Magazine, University of Notre Dame, Spring 2006
 Under Ground by Yvonne Baskin, Island Press, 2005, Chapter VI "Microbes, Muck, and Dead Zones"
 Sven Erik Jørgensen, Denmark; William J. Mitsch, USA, Stockholm International Water Institute, 2004 

By William Mitsch

Selected Books

 Mitsch, W.J. and J.G. Gosselink. 2015.  Wetlands, 5th ed., John Wiley & Sons, Inc., New York 
 Mitsch, W.J., J.G. Gosselink, C.J. Anderson, and L. Zhang. 2009. Wetland Ecosystems, John Wiley & Sons, Inc., New York, 295 pp.
 Mitsch, W.J. and S.E. Jørgensen. 2004. Ecological Engineering and Ecosystem Restoration. John Wiley & Sons, New York. 472 pp.
 Mitsch, W.J. and S.E. Jørgensen. 1989. Ecological Engineering: An  Introduction to Ecotechnology.  John Wiley & Sons, New York. 472 pp.

Selected Journal Articles

References

External links
 Everglades Wetland Research Park

1947 births
American ecologists
Educators from West Virginia
Illinois Institute of Technology faculty
Living people
Ohio State University faculty
Writers from Wheeling, West Virginia
University of Florida alumni
University of Louisville faculty
University of Notre Dame alumni
Wheeling Central Catholic High School alumni
Scientists from West Virginia
Engineers from West Virginia
Florida Gulf Coast University faculty